Recherche ('Research') was a French language daily newspaper published in Greece. The newspaper was founded in 1898. As of 1937, its director was Antoine Bortolis and its editor Jean Bortolis. It served as the organ of the People's Party in the Chania region.    .

References

French-language newspapers published in Greece
1898 establishments in Greece
Mass media in Chania
Daily newspapers published in Greece